HO6LA (ホムラ; pronounced Homura), was a Japanese alternative idol girl group that formed in 2021. They released their debut single, "Pirakarira", on October 26, 2021. They disbanded on September 12, 2022.

History

2021: Formation and debut with "Pirakarira"
On April 17, 2021, Ichigo Rinahamu announced that she would be holding auditions in order to produce an idol group. Former Bis and Carry Loose member Pan Luna Leafy was revealed as the first member. On August 18, the line-up was finalised with the addition of former Piggs member Umi Hachimitsu, along with Roa Kusunoki, Wannyan Circuit DX!, Emiru and Wazurai. Their debut single, "Pirakarira", was released on October 26, 2021.

2022: Sono Ichi and disbandment
The digital single, "Boooost!!", was released on January 10, 2022, followed by "Idol Fire" on April 17. They released their first studio album, Sono Ichi, on June 15. The group disbanded on September 12 due to disagreement on the direction that the group would take.

Former members

Discography

Studio albums

Singles

References

Japanese girl groups
Japanese idol groups
Japanese pop music groups
Musical groups from Tokyo
Musical groups established in 2021
2021 establishments in Japan
Musical groups disestablished in 2022
2022 disestablishments in Japan